Alba Township may refer to the following townships in the United States:

 Alba Township, Illinois
 Alba Township, Minnesota